Oliver John Monksfield (born 1981) is an international footballer. He represented Great Britain at the 20th Deaflympic Games held in Melbourne in 2005, winning a gold medal. He competed again in the 2009 Deaflympic Games in Taipei.

He is currently a teacher.

References

Squad Profile
BBC match report

Living people
British footballers
Place of birth missing (living people)
Association footballers not categorized by position
1981 births